William Daily may refer to:

William Mitchel Daily (1812–1877), third president of Indiana University
Bill Daily (1927–2018), American comedian and actor

See also
William Daley (disambiguation)
William Daly (disambiguation)
William Dailey (disambiguation)